Anna Maria Ramenghi (born 20 May 1945 in Castel Guelfo, Bologna) is an Italian singer.

Discography
1964: Cocktail di canzoni (RCA Italiana PML 10379 - brani "Amado mio" e "No" sul lato A; brani "Ti seguirò" e "Viaggio nell'infinito" sul 
Singles
1961: Il segreto / A te (RCA Italiana PM45-3045)
1962: Non ti credo / La porta del cielo (RCA Italiana PM45-3063)
1962: Canadian twist / Frenetico twist (RCA Italiana)
1963: Il bene o il male / Acqua passata (RCA Italiana PM45-3178)
1964: Il ragazzo del mio palazzo / Non sei più come prima (RCA Italiana PM45-3273)
1976: Fernando / Amaro fiore (Las Vegas LVS 1075)

References

1945 births
Living people
Italian singers
Musicians from Bologna